Saint-Pierre-sur-Dropt (literally Saint-Pierre on Dropt; Languedocien: Sent Pèir de Dròt) is a commune in the Lot-et-Garonne department in south-western France.

See also
Communes of the Lot-et-Garonne department

References

Saintpierresurdropt